Care Bears, the original television series, aired in the United States and Canada between 1985 and 1988 (with two specials broadcast prior to the regular run). Episodes aired on ABC in the United States, on Global (ATV & ASN in Atlantic Canada) in Canada, and also in broadcast syndication. The series is based on the American Greetings franchise of the same name.

Series overview

Atkinson Film-Arts specials
In 1983, Atkinson Film-Arts of Ottawa produced the first two Care Bears specials.

DIC series (1985)
DIC Enterprises produced an 11-episode series, which aired in 1985.

Nelvana series (1986–1988)

The Care Bears Family, produced by Toronto's Nelvana studio, premiered on September 13, 1986 on ABC in the U.S. and Global in Canada.

Season 1 (1986)

Season 2 (1987)

Season 3 (1988)

Home Video releases

DIC series

References

Episodes
Lists of American children's animated television series episodes
Lists of Canadian children's animated television series episodes